Jonathan Neil Cross (born 2 March 1975) is a footballer who played as a full back in the Football League for Wrexham, Hereford United and Chester City.

References

1975 births
Living people
People from Wallasey
Association football fullbacks
English footballers
Wrexham A.F.C. players
Hereford United F.C. players
Chester City F.C. players
Colwyn Bay F.C. players
English Football League players